Harry Dahl (25 June 1902 – 2 December 1986), nicknamed Hacke, was a Swedish footballer who played as a forward. His older brother Albin Dahl was also a footballer.

Career
With 334 goals, he is Landskrona BoIS's top goal scorer of all time. Also like his brother, he began to play football in a Landsrona-based club called BK Argos. When Landskrona BoIS was founded in 1915, Albin began to play for them, but Harry was too young. A few years later he was old enough to join his brother Albin in Landskrona BoIS. As soon as 1922, both he and Albin moved to neighbouring Helsingborg to play for Landskrona rivals Helsingborg IF. Unlike Albin, Harry only played one season in Helsingborg and then returned to Landskrona and BoIS in conjunction with the inaugural season of the first national Swedish league, Allsvenskan. Harry played eight seasons in Allsvenskan and retired after the 1931–32 season at age 30.

His hope of playing for Sweden at the 1924 Olympics in Paris was thwarted by his supervisor at his workplace, Thulinverken, who refused to allow him to go.

References

1902 births
1986 deaths
Association football forwards
Swedish footballers
Sweden international footballers
Allsvenskan players
Helsingborgs IF players
Landskrona BoIS players